Sonnencroft (also known as the Clyde E. Hutchinson House) was a historic residence located along Morgantown Avenue (near the present site of East Fairmont Junior High School) in Fairmont in the U.S. state of West Virginia.

Sonnencroft was completed in 1912. It was a huge stucco and tile mansion based on the Inverness Castle in Scotland. The fortunes of the coal industry reversed during the Great Depression and in the 1960s the abandoned residence was razed in order for the property to be donated to the Marion County Board of Education.

See also
 High Gate

References

Landmarks in West Virginia
Buildings and structures in Marion County, West Virginia